Sander Coopman (born 12 March 1995) is a Belgian professional footballer who plays as an attacking midfielder for Challenger Pro League club Beveren.

Club career 

Coopman joined Brugge at the age of 12 from S.V. Zulte Waregem. He made his senior debut at 11 December 2014 in the UEFA Europa League against HJK Helsinki. Brugge manager Michel Preud'homme gave him a place in his starting line-up. He was later sent on loan to his former club Zulte Waregem.

On 4 July 2019, he signed a three-year contract with Antwerp.

Coopman joined Challenger Pro League club Beveren on 2 August 2022, signing a one-year contract after a successful trial.

Honours
Club Brugge
 Belgian Pro League: 2015–16
 Belgian Cup: 2014–15

Zulte Waregem
 Belgian Cup: 2016–17

References

External links

1995 births
Living people
Belgian footballers
Belgium youth international footballers
Association football midfielders
Club Brugge KV players
S.V. Zulte Waregem players
Royal Antwerp F.C. players
S.K. Beveren players
Belgian Pro League players
Challenger Pro League players